Kaboré Tambi National Park is a national park in Burkina Faso. It is situated between Ouagadougou and the border with Ghana and follows the course of the Nazinon river. Founded in 1976 as Pô National Park, it has been renamed in honor of a ranger of the park who was killed by poachers in 1991.

The vegetation in the park is mainly distributed in northern Sudan savanna grassland for the north and in the south, a blend of the southern Sudan savanna and northern Guinea savanna.

The park is an important birding area in Burkina Faso which bird species like Senegal Parrot, Violet Turaco, yellow billed shrike, Blue Blair roller, yellow Penduline, pipes, bearded Barbet, Pied winged swallow, Senegal Eremonela, Blackcap Babbler, sun lark, Purple glossy starling, lavender Waxbill. Chestnut crowned sparrow weaver, Brown romped bunting and many other birds.

References

External links 
 Birdlife International

National parks of Burkina Faso
Protected areas established in 1976